Thiago de Oliveira Perpétuo (born December 14, 1986) is a Brazilian mixed martial artist who last competed in 2015. A professional since 2009, he has competed for the UFC, XFC, and was a competitor on The Ultimate Fighter: Brazil.

Mixed martial arts career

The Ultimate Fighter
In March 2012, Perpétuo appeared as a fighter on The Ultimate Fighter: Brazil. Perpétuo defeated Joao Paulo De Souza via decision to move into the Ultimate Fighter house, and become an official cast member, fighting for Team Vitor.

In the first round of the competition, Perpétuo fought Francisco Trinaldo. Perpétuo won the fight via TKO (retirement) to move onto the semi-final round. Later, Dana White demanded that the teams be scrambled up and Perpétuo was sent to Team Wanderlei.  He then faced eventual winner Cezar Ferreira for a spot in the final against Daniel Sarafian. He was defeated by Ferreira via KO (head kick) in round one.

Ultimate Fighting Championship
Perpétuo made his UFC debut on June 23, 2012 at UFC 147 against Leonardo Mafra. He won the fight via TKO in the third round.

Perpétuo was expected to face Michael Kuiper on January 19, 2013 at UFC on FX 7. However Perpetuo suffered an injury and was replaced by Caio Magalhaes.

Perpetuo made his return at UFC Fight Night 32 where he faced UFC newcomer Omari Akhmedov He lost the back-and-forth fight via knockout in the first round.  Despite the loss on his record, Perpetuo was awarded a Fight of the Night bonus for this bout.

Perpetuo faced Kenny Robertson in a welterweight bout on March 23, 2014 at UFC Fight Night 38. He lost the fight via submission in the first round, and was subsequently released from the promotion shortly after.

Championships and awards

Mixed martial arts
 Ultimate Fighting Championship
 Fight of the Night (One time) vs. Omari Akhmedov

Mixed martial arts record

|-
|Loss
|align=center|9–4–1
|Alberto Uda
|TKO (knee)
|XFC i 13
| 
|align=center|1
|align=center|2:19
|Sao Paulo, Brazil
|Return to Middleweight.
|-
|Loss
|align=center|9–3–1
|Kenny Robertson
|Submission (rear-naked choke)
|UFC Fight Night: Shogun vs. Henderson 2
| 
|align=center|1
|align=center|1:45
|Natal, Brazil
|
|-
|Loss
|align=center|9–2–1
|Omari Akhmedov
|KO (punches)
|UFC Fight Night: Belfort vs. Henderson
|
|align=center|1
|align=center|3:31
|Goiânia, Brazil
|
|-
|Win
|align=center|9–1–1
|Leonardo Mafra
|TKO (punches)
|UFC 147
|
|align=center|3
|align=center|0:41
|Belo Horizonte, Brazil
|
|-
|Win
|align=center|8–1–1
|Edgar Castaldelli Filho
|TKO (punches)
|Max Fight 9
|
|align=center|3
|align=center|3:10
|Campinas, Brazil
|
|-
|Win
|align=center|7–1–1
|Willians Santos
|Decision (unanimous)
|Jungle Fight 26
|
|align=center|3
|align=center|5:00
|São Paulo, Brazil
|
|-
|Win
|align=center|6–1–1
|Thiago Tenorio
|TKO (punches)
|Conquest Fighting Championships
|
|align=center|2
|align=center|N/A
|São Paulo, Brazil
|
|-
|Win
|align=center|5–1–1
|Luis Matoso
|TKO (punches)
|Jungle Fight 20
|
|align=center|3
|align=center|2:12
|São Paulo, Brazil
|
|-
|Draw
|align=center|4–1–1
|Luis Matoso
|Draw
|Jungle Fight 19
|
|align=center|3
|align=center|5:00
|Moema, Brazil
|
|-
|Win
|align=center|4–1
|Rafael Navas
|TKO (punches)
|Iron Fight Championship 1
|
|align=center|2
|align=center|3:53
|São Caetano do Sul, Brazil
|
|-
|Loss
|align=center|3–1
|Danilo Pereira
|Submission (rear-naked choke)
|Full Fight 2
|
|align=center|3
|align=center|4:46
|São Paulo, Brazil
|
|-
|Win
|align=center|3–0
|Fernando Silva
|TKO (punches)
|Real Fight 7
|
|align=center|1
|align=center|3:20
|São Paulo, Brazil
|
|-
|Win
|align=center|2–0
|Alvaro Salles
|Submission (rear-naked choke)
|Tan Lan Fight 9
|
|align=center|1
|align=center|0:59
|São Caetano do Sul, Brazil
|
|-
|Win
|align=center|1–0
|Deschanael Deschanael
|KO (punch)
|Tan Lan Fight 9
|
|align=center|1
|align=center|0:23
|São Caetano do Sul, Brazil
|

Mixed martial arts exhibition record

|-
|Loss
|align=center|2–1
| Cezar Ferreira
|KO (head kick)
|The Ultimate Fighter: Brazil
|N/A
|align=center| 1
|align=center| 1:22
|Brazil
|Fought at 185
|-
|Win
|align=center|2–0
| Francisco Trinaldo
|TKO (retirement)
|The Ultimate Fighter: Brazil
|N/A
|align=center| 1
|align=center| 5:00
|Brazil
|Fought at 185
|-
|Win
|align=center|1–0
| Joao Paulo De Souza
|Decision (unanimous)
|The Ultimate Fighter: Brazil
|N/A
|align=center| 2
|align=center| 5:00
|Brazil
|Fought at 185

See also
List of male mixed martial artists

References

External links

Living people
Brazilian male mixed martial artists
Middleweight mixed martial artists
Mixed martial artists utilizing Muay Thai
Mixed martial artists utilizing Brazilian jiu-jitsu
1986 births
Ultimate Fighting Championship male fighters
Brazilian Muay Thai practitioners
Brazilian practitioners of Brazilian jiu-jitsu
People from Santo André, São Paulo
Sportspeople from São Paulo (state)